The Vanuatu national under-15 football team is the national U-15 team of Vanuatu and is controlled by the Vanuatu Football Federation.

History

The Vanuatu national under-17 football team took part five times in a tournament (1995, 2005, 2009, 2011 and 2013) and the best result was in 2005 when it reached the final, losing to Australia.

Competition record

OFC
The OFC Under 17 Qualifying Tournament is a tournament held once every two years to decide the only qualification spot for Oceania Football Confederation (OFC) and representatives at the FIFA U-17 World Cup.

Matches

2014

Squad for Football at the 2014 Summer Youth Olympics – Boys' tournament

Squad for Football at the 2010 Summer Youth Olympics – Boys' tournament

Caps and goals as of 30 August 2010.

|-

! colspan="9"  style="background:#b0d3fb; text-align:left;"|
|- style="background:#dfedfd;"

|-

! colspan="9"  style="background:#b0d3fb; text-align:left;"|
|- style="background:#dfedfd;"

|-
! colspan="9"  style="background:#b0d3fb; text-align:left;"|
|- style="background:#dfedfd;"

References

External links
 Vanuatu Football Federation official website

under-15
National under-15 association football teams